Ömer Arslan (born 15 July 1993) is a Turkish footballer who plays as a centre-back.

References

External links
 
 

1993 births
Living people
Sportspeople from Tokat
Turkish footballers
Turkey B international footballers
Turkey youth international footballers
Beşiktaş J.K. footballers
Antalyaspor footballers
Süper Lig players
Association football defenders